Sehirus is a genus of burrowing bugs or negro bugs belonging to the family Cydnidae, subfamily Sehirinae.

Species
 Sehirus aeneus Walker, 1867
 Sehirus cinctus (Palisot, 1811)
 Sehirus cypriacus Dohrn, 1860
 Sehirus luctuosus Mulsant & Rey, 1866
 Sehirus maculipes Müller & Rey
 Sehirus morio (Linnaeus, 1761)
 Sehirus ovatus (Herrich-Schäffer, 1840)
 Sehirus parens Mulsant & Rey, 1866
 Sehirus sexmaculatus (Rambur, 1842

Junior synonym Canthophorus 

 Canthophorus dubius (Scopoli, 1763)
 Canthophorus fuscipennis (Horváth, 1899)
 Canthophorus impressus (Horváth, 1881)
 Canthophorus maculipes (Mulsant, 1852)
 Canthophorus melanopterus (Herrich-Schäffer, 1835)
 Canthophorus mixtus Asanova, 1964
 Canthophorus niveimarginatus Scott, 1874

References

External links
 EOL

Cydnidae
Pentatomomorpha genera